The Forests of Silence is a fantasy novel written by Australian author Emily Rodda, and is the first book in the eight-volume Deltora Quest series. It was first published in 2000 by Scholastic and was awarded the "Notable Series in Children's Book of the Year Awards 2001: Younger Readers". The novel follows a teenage boy named Lief as he and his companions search the deadly Forests of Silence for the magical Topaz gem, one of the seven missing gems from the belt of Deltora.

Plot summary
The book opens with a boy called Jarred, a friend of Prince Endon. After the death of King Alton and his queen, Endon is proclaimed King in his father's place. To consummate this, a magical steel belt, the Belt of Deltora, is set around Endon's waist. The Belt recognizes Endon as Deltora's rightful king. Jarred goes to the library and learns that the evil Shadow Lord, a Sauron-like intelligence located in the Shadowlands, once tried to seize the land in which is the kingdom of Deltora. Because the people of those days were divided into seven tribes, the Shadow Army soon overwhelmed much of the land. Jarred learned that a blacksmith named Adin gathered the sacred talismans from each tribe and attached them to a chain of steel medallions. The people's trust in Adin, channeled through the gems, was powerful enough to drive back the Shadow Army into its own dark home, the Shadowlands. Adin later became king of the united land called Deltora; yet he never forgot that the Enemy was not destroyed. He therefore never let the Belt out of his sight. With every generation, the Belt was worn less and less, diminishing its effect. The kings and queens also let their power go to the administrative council, diminishing its power.

Jarred, learning of this, urges Endon to put on the Belt and revive the custom of Adin. Before he can explain in detail, Chief Advisor Prandine, who is ugly and evil, enters and accuses Jarred of treason. Jarred escapes Prandine and finds that the city has fallen into disrepair, and Deltora has become a virtual dystopia. Jarred then becomes apprentice and successor to Crian the blacksmith, later to marry Crian's granddaughter Anna.

Seven years later, the gems of Deltora were stolen by the Ak-Baba under the Shadow Lord and were scattered throughout the land. This also allowed the Enemy to enter the land. Jarred helps King Endon and Queen Sharn (Endon's pregnant bride) escape the invasion through a secret tunnel.

Sixteen years later, the Shadow Lord tyrannically rules Deltora. A person identified as Jarred's son and apprentice, Lief, has been born during this time. He has been raised to reject the Shadow Lord, but never to show any obvious opposition. On his birthday, Lief's father sends his son, accompanied by a soldier named Barda, to find the lost gems from the Belt and restore them to the belt to defeat the evil shadowlord.

The nearest gem, the golden topaz, is to be found in Mid Wood, which is one of three perilous Forests of Silence. While travelling to the forest, Wenns capture them and take them into First Wood as an offering to the predator known as Wennbar. Before being eaten, a wild forest-dwelling girl of Lief's own age, called Jasmine appears. Jasmine, after a brief reluctance, rescues Lief and Barda, later to leads them to the Dark in the heart of Mid Wood. There, they discover a wall made of steadfastly cultivated vines, enclosing a clearing in the very center of the forest. In that center grow three flowers called the Lilies of Life, whose nectar possesses healing properties and grant everlasting life. The wall of vines was guarded by a Jalis knight called Gorl, who sought to drink of the Nectar of Life and become immortal. Over the years, Gorl's body has rotted away, leaving nothing behind but his memories and his intentions. He captures Lief and Barda.

Under their questions, Gorl narrates all, while Barda strives to break the psychokinetic control held by the knight over their bodies. Barda breaks the grip, but is given a mortal wound by Gorl's sword. As he is about to kill Lief, Jasmine persuades a tree to drop a limb onto Gorl, thus destroying him and breaching his wall. Sunlight enters the Dark, and the Lilies of Life bloom at last. Jasmine and Lief use their nectar to heal the dying Barda. As the Lilies fade, Jasmine takes the last of the nectar into a jar, so that she might use it on future injuries.

Lief takes the topaz from its position as the pommel of Gorl's sword and fits it into the Belt of Deltora. The three relax and recuperate, while animals from all over Mid Wood enter the breach in Gorl's wall and devour the vines. Later, Barda and Lief re-embark, with Jasmine and her animal companions Kree and Filli in company.

Characters

Lief: Lief is the main character of the series. Lief was born to parents Jarred and Anna of the Forge. As a child Lief roamed the streets of Del, sharpening his wits and gaining him the skills needed for his future quests. Though he did not know it, he was constantly protected by Barda and he prided himself on his many 'lucky' escapes. On his sixteenth birthday it is revealed to him that he must begin a dangerous quest to find the lost gems of the Belt of Deltora.
Barda: Barda was enlisted as a friend by the king and queen of Deltora and was trusted to help him find the lost gems of Deltora sixteen years before the initial story took place. For the next sixteen years Barda disguised himself as a beggar so as to discover information vital to the quest. He also became the bodyguard of Jarred and Anna's child Lief, albeit without the semi-arrogant Lief's knowledge thereof. Upon Lief's sixteenth birthday Barda revealed himself to Lief and the quest for the gems of Deltora began. Though Barda was at first annoyed to travel encumbered by a child, he soon saw Lief as more of a help than a hindrance.
Jasmine: Jasmine is a wild girl, described as having wild black hair and emerald green eyes who has grown up in the Forests of Silence, where Lief and Barda meet her shortly after leaving Del. Her parents were captured by Grey Guards when she was seven years old, and so she has been raised by the forest. She can understand the language of the trees and of many animals, and has incredibly sharp senses, but has trouble understanding some social customs. Jasmine is usually seen with her raven, Kree, and a mouse-like creature she calls Filli. Jasmine is like Lief and occasionally has a quick temper. After helping Lief and Barda in the forest and with the help of the topaz, she is greeted by her mother's spirit from beyond the grave, who tells her to go with Lief and Barda in their quest. After this encounter, she joins Lief and Barda in the search for the great gems that will complete the Belt.

See also

Deltora series
Deltora Quest (anime)

References

External links
Official USA Deltora website
Official Australian Deltora website
Official Emily Rodda website

2000 novels
2000 fantasy novels
Australian children's novels
Children's fantasy novels
Deltora
2000 children's books
Scholastic Corporation books